Historically, an onmyōji is a practitioner of the art of onmyōdō.

Onmyōji may also refer to:

Books
Onmyōji (novel series), a novel series by Baku Yumemakura
Onmyoji (manga), a manga series by Reiko Okano
Shōnen Onmyōji, a light novel series by Mitsuru Yūki

Films
Onmyōji (film), a 2001 Japanese historical fantasy film based on the novel series Onmyōji
Onmyōji 2, a 2003 Japanese historical fantasy film
The Yin-Yang Master: Dream of Eternity, a 2020 Chinese fantasy film based on the novel series Onmyōji
The Yinyang Master, a 2021 Chinese fantasy film based on the video game that was based on the novel series Onmyōji

Other uses
Onmyōji, a role-playing video game developed and published by NetEase based on the novel series Onmyōji